Waltraut Grassl was a luger from Czechoslovakia who competed in the late 1930s. She won a silver medal in the women's singles event at the 1938 FIL European Luge Championships in Salzburg, Austria and one year later in Liberec.

References
 List of European luge champions

Czechoslovak female lugers
German Bohemian people
Year of birth missing
Year of death missing
Czechoslovak people of German descent